The Fujitsu Toshiba IS12T is a mobile smartphone running the Windows Phone operating system and was designed and manufactured by Fujitsu Toshiba. The phone is waterproof and is the first and only Windows Phone to be officially released in Japan under carrier KDDI.

Launch
Fujitsu Toshiba mobile communications announced the Fujitsu Toshiba IS12T on July 26, 2011 and available for retail on September 11.

Hardware
The IS12T is the first waterproof Windows Phone and also the first to feature a 13.2 Megapixel camera. It can operate on either 
CDMA2000/EV-DO Rev. A or GSM/UMTS networks.

It is able to receive earthquake warnings.

See also
Windows Phone

References

Windows Phone devices
Smartphones
Mobile phones introduced in 2011